Andrej Markudov (born 23 March 1996) is a Macedonian handball player who plays for RK Aerodrom.

Biography
Starting with handball at the age of 13 Andrej was found by RK Metalurg scouts and immediately given a 5-year contract. As one of the top prospects in his position he managed to seal his place in the Metalurg youth team and the youth categories of the national team. Since 2011 he played in every national meeting, having over 100 games for the NT, but eventually missed the 2017 World Men's Handball Championship due lack of play time in his club. 

In 2015 he was traded to RK Pelister in a swap including four players. His career in Bitola went on and off as the team changed coaches throughout his two years of stay, eventually having the greatest of impact on the hand of the legendary coach Kasim Kamenica.

Leaving RK Pelister in August 2017 he joined the ambitious project of RK Butel Skopje as a new top project in Macedonian handball is born.

References

1996 births
Living people
Macedonian male handball players
Sportspeople from Skopje